Las Matas de Farfán is a town in the San Juan Province, Dominican Republic. It is the birthplace of a number of current and former Major League Baseball players including Jean Segura, Juan Encarnación, Roberto Novoa, Odalis Perez, Ramón Santiago, and Valerio de los Santos. During the 1822–44 Haitian occupation, the town was officially designated as Las-Mathas.

The Furnia de Catanamatias, in the mountain range above the town, is the deepest cave in the Dominican republic (380m).

Climate
Las Matas de Farfán has a tropical monsoon climate (Am) with very hot daytime temperatures year round with milder nighttime temperatures. Diurnal temperature range is very large for somewhere in the Caribbean.

References 

Municipalities of the Dominican Republic
Populated places in San Juan Province (Dominican Republic)